Machine Heart may refer to:

Machine Heart, label  Arthur Loves Plastic discography
"Machine Heart", song by Gary Numan from The Radial Pair: Video Soundtrack
"Machine Heart", song by Kelsea Ballerini from Unapologetically